The Americas Zone was one of three zones of regional competition in the 2005 Fed Cup.

Group I
Venue: Carrasco Lawn Tennis Club, Montevideo, Uruguay (outdoor clay) 
Date: 20–23 April

The eight teams were divided into two pools of four teams. The teams that finished first in the pools played-off to determine which team would partake in the World Group II Play-offs. The four nations coming last or second-to-last in the pools also played-off to determine which would be relegated to Group II for 2006.

Pools

Play-offs

  advanced to 2005 World Group II Play-offs.

Group II
Venue: Liga de Tenis de Campo de Antioquia, Medellín, Colombia (outdoor clay) 
Date: 21–23 April

The four teams played in one pool of four, with the two teams placing first and second in the pool advancing to Group I for 2006.

Pool

  and  advanced to Group I for 2006.

See also
Fed Cup structure

References

 Fed Cup Profile, Mexico
 Fed Cup Profile, Uruguay
 Fed Cup Profile, Puerto Rico
 Fed Cup Profile, Canada
 Fed Cup Profile, Brazil
 Fed Cup Profile, Cuba
 Fed Cup Profile, Chile
 Fed Cup Profile, Colombia
 Fed Cup Profile, Dominican Republic

External links
 Fed Cup website

 
Americas
Sports competitions in Montevideo
Tennis tournaments in Uruguay
Sport in Medellín
Tennis tournaments in Colombia
2005 in Uruguayan tennis
International sports competitions hosted by Uruguay
Women's sports competitions in Uruguay
International sports competitions hosted by Colombia
2005 in Colombian tennis